Edwin Ifeanyi (born April 28, 1972) is a former Cameroonian football player.

Club statistics

National team statistics

References

External links

1972 births
Living people
Cameroonian footballers
Cameroonian expatriate footballers
J1 League players
J2 League players
Japan Football League (1992–1998) players
FC Tokyo players
Tokyo Verdy players
Omiya Ardija players
Oita Trinita players
Montedio Yamagata players
Expatriate footballers in Japan
Association football midfielders
Cameroon international footballers